The Anglican Church of St Margaret in Middle Chinnock, Somerset, England was built in the 12th century. It is a Grade II* listed building.

History

The church was built in the 12th century with the tower and porch being added in the 14th or 15th centuries. It underwent extensive Victorian restoration in the 19th century, which included the removal of the gallery.

The parish is part of the Norton-sub-Hamdon benefice within the Diocese of Bath and Wells.

Architecture

The hamstone building has slate roofs.

Inside the church are panels and a hatchment from the 15th to 17th centuries and a font from the 12th. A 14th century effigy of a priest was restored by W. D. Caröe in 1928.

In the churchyard is a war memorial with a tapered shaft and wheel cross.

References

Grade II* listed buildings in South Somerset
Grade II* listed churches in Somerset
Middle Chinnock